Phytoecia astarte is a species of beetle in the family Cerambycidae. It was described by Ganglbauer in 1885. It is known from Syria, Lebanon, Azerbaijan, Georgia, Armenia, and Turkey.

Subspecies
 Phytoecia astarte lederi Pic, 1899
 Phytoecia astarte perrini Pic, 1891
 Phytoecia astarte astarte Ganglbauer, 1885

References

Phytoecia
Beetles described in 1885